Kirovsk, known as Khibinogorsk until 1934, is a town in Murmansk Oblast, Russia, located at the spurs of the Khibiny Mountains on the shores of the Lake Bolshoy Vudyavr,  south of Murmansk. Population:

History
A settlement which eventually became Kirovsk was founded in 1929, soon after an expedition led by Alexander Fersman had discovered large deposits of apatite and nepheline in the Khibiny Massif in the 1920s. By the end of 1930, its population grew to ten thousand people, and a mining and chemical plant here was well under construction. Due to the rapid growth, the Presidium of the Murmansk Okrug Executive Committee petitioned on January 18, 1931 to grant the settlement town status and to name it Khibinogorsk. The petition was approved by the All-Russian Central Executive Committee Resolution on October 30, 1931 and the town was subordinated directly to the Murmansk Okrug Executive Committee. On December 15, 1934, the town was renamed Kirovsk after recently assassinated Sergey Kirov, who had been in charge of planning the development of the deposits.

On February 26, 1935, when new Kirovsky District was established on part of the territory of Kolsko-Loparsky District, Kirovsk was transferred to it and made its administrative center. On May 6, 1954, by the Decree of the Presidium of the Supreme Soviet of the Soviet Union, Kirovsk was elevated in status to that of a town under oblast jurisdiction. Kirovsky District was abolished, and its territory was subordinated to Kirovsk.

By the September 20, 1965 Presidium of the Supreme Soviet of the Russian SFSR Decree, the work settlement of Kovdor located on the territory under Kirovsk's jurisdiction was granted town under district jurisdiction status and subordinated to Kirovsk Town Soviet. On January 6, 1966, the Murmansk Oblast Executive Committee petitioned to transform the work settlement of Molodyozhny located on the territory under Kirovsk's jurisdiction into a town under oblast jurisdiction called Khibinogorsk and on subordinating a part of the territory in Kirovsk's jurisdiction to it. The petition was reviewed by the Presidium of the Supreme Soviet of the Russian SFSR, which, however, decreed on July 7, 1966 to merge the work settlements of Molodyozhny and Apatity into a town under oblast jurisdiction, which would retain the name Apatity. Consequently, the Murmansk Oblast Executive Committee subordinated a part of the territory under Kirovsk's jurisdiction to the new town by the decision of October 13, 1966.

Administrative and municipal status
Within the framework of administrative divisions, it is, together with two rural localities, incorporated as Kirovsk Town with Jurisdictional Territory—an administrative unit with the status equal to that of the districts. As a municipal division, Kirovsk Town with Jurisdictional Territory is incorporated as Kirovsk Urban Okrug.

Population development
1959: 40,500
1970: 38,500
1979: 41,300
1989 Census: 43,526
2002 Census: 31,593
2010 Census: 28,625

Miscellaneous
The northernmost botanical garden in Russia is located in Kirovsk.

Tourism
Kirovsk is the northernmost mountained ski area in Europe. There are two major ski resorts in the town: Bigwood and Kukisvumchorr with nearly 50 km of slopes operating from November to June. The tourism industry is developing rapidly with new hotels and ski lifts opening every year.

International relations

Twin towns and sister cities
Kirovsk is twinned with:
 Gällivare Municipality, Sweden
 Harstad, Norway
 Tornio, Finland
 Newry, United Kingdom

References

Notes

Sources

External links

Botanical Garden in Kirovsk 

Cities and towns in Murmansk Oblast
Cities and towns built in the Soviet Union
Populated places established in 1929
Monotowns in Russia
Former urban-type settlements of Murmansk Oblast